Ari Moisanen (born September 7, 1971) is a Finnish former professional ice hockey goaltender. He is currently a goaltender coach with Tps turku in liiga.

Moisanen served as goaltender coach for the Finland men's national ice hockey team at the 2014 Winter Olympics, and the 2013 and 2014 IIHF World Championships.and he was a goaltender coach for finland national team from 2013-2016

References

1971 births
Finnish ice hockey coaches
Finnish ice hockey goaltenders
Living people
People from Rauma, Finland
Sportspeople from Satakunta